Tandamine is a selective norepinephrine reuptake inhibitor with a tricyclic structure. It was developed in the 1970s as an antidepressant but was never commercialized. Tandamine is analogous to pirandamine, which, instead, acts as a selective serotonin reuptake inhibitor (SSRI).

The exact identical same structure, although this time changing the thioether to a methylene group revealed a strongest compound of the series called AY 24614.

See also 
 Pirandamine

References 

Norepinephrine reuptake inhibitors